Bryant Lee Mix (born July 28, 1972) is a former American football defensive end who played two seasons with the Houston/Tennessee Oilers of the National Football League. He was drafted by the Houston Oilers in the second round of the 1996 NFL Draft (38th Overall). He first enrolled at Northwest Mississippi Community College before transferring to Alcorn State University. Mix attended Water Valley High School in Water Valley, Mississippi. He now coaches at the school, winning a state championship in 2018.

References

External links
Just Sports Stats

Living people
1972 births
Players of American football from Mississippi
American football defensive ends
African-American players of American football
Alcorn State Braves football players
Houston Oilers players
Tennessee Oilers players
People from Water Valley, Mississippi
21st-century African-American sportspeople
20th-century African-American sportspeople